Kheri is a town and a Nagar Panchayat in Lakhimpur Kheri district in the Indian state of Uttar Pradesh.

History
According to the 1908 British publication "The Imperial Gazetteer of India"(volume: XV):

[S. H. Butler, Settlement Report (1901) ; H. R. Nevill, District Gazetteer (1905).] 

Kherl Town (Khiri). — Town in the khiri tahsil of Kherl District, United Provinces, situated in 27° 54' N. and 8o c 48' E., on the Lucknow-Bareilly State Railway. Population (1901), 6,223. Kheri is a place of some antiquity, and contains a tine tomb built over the remains of Saiyid Khurd, who died in 1563. It is administered under Act XX of 1856, with an income of about Rs. 800. Though giving its name to the District, it is of small importance. A daily market is held, and the town contains a branch of the American Methodist Mission and a school with 144 pupils.

Geography
It has an average elevation of 148 metres (485 feet).

Demographics
 India census, Kheri had a population of 33,355. Males constitute 52% of the population and females 48%. Kheri has an average literacy rate of 51.7%, lower than the national average of 73%: male literacy is 55.4%, and female literacy is 47.7%. In Kheri, 15% of the population is under 6 years of age.

References

Cities and towns in Lakhimpur Kheri district